Jackson Ridge is a suburb of Honiara, Solomon Islands and is located south of Panatina.

References

Populated places in Guadalcanal Province
Suburbs of Honiara